The men's long jump event at the 1975 Pan American Games was held in Mexico City on 13 October.

Medalists

Results

Qualification
Qualification performance: 7.20

Final

References

Athletics at the 1975 Pan American Games
1975